Agah-e Olya (also Romanized as Āgāh-e ‘Olyā; also known as Āgāh, Āgāh-e Bālā, Āgāh Kolyā’ī, Āgha, and Āqā) is a village in Agahan Rural District, Kolyai District, Sonqor County, Kermanshah Province, Iran. At the 2006 census, its population was 383, in 95 families.

References 

Populated places in Sonqor County